Barm-e Jamal (also Romanized as Barm-e Jamāl) is a village in Mashayekh Rural District, Doshman Ziari District, Mamasani County, Fars Province, Iran. At the 2006 census, its population was 86, in 16 families.

References 

Populated places in Mamasani County